Star Flyer is a carousel-meets-watchtower style amusement ride in Tivoli Gardens, Copenhagen, Denmark. It was manufactured by Funtime and opened in May 2006.

Statistics
Height 
Platform diameter 
Chairs 12 (2 seats each)
Capacity circa 960 passengers/hour
Maximum rotation speed 
Maximum vertical speed

References

External links

 Tivoli.dk — The Star Flyer

Swing rides
Amusement rides introduced in 2006
Landmarks in Copenhagen
Amusement rides manufactured by Funtime
Towers in Denmark
2006 establishments in Denmark
Towers completed in 2006